Team 18 (formerly known as Charlie Schwerkolt Racing) is an Australian motor racing team currently competing in the Supercars Championship, running two Holden ZB Commodores. The team's current drivers are Mark Winterbottom and Scott Pye.

History

Background
The team is owned by Gold Coast businessman Charlie Schwerkolt, who previously had a shareholding in Dick Johnson Racing. The relationship between Schwerkolt and Dick Johnson broke down at the end of 2010, the year James Courtney won the championship for the team. As part of the split Schwerkolt retained ownership of one of the two Racing Entitlement Contracts (RECs).

Schwerkolt had attempted to conclude a deal to run a fourth car out of Ford Performance Racing with Courtney driving, but after Courtney signed to drive with the Holden Racing Team, the deal collapsed. The REC was instead leased to Dick Johnson Racing for James Moffat's entry for the 2011 and 2012 seasons.

Satellite team

With the rules governing the use of Racing Entitlement Contracts dictating that Schwerkolt could only lease his to one party for two years, he either had to sell it, lease it to another party, or use it himself. Schwerkolt decided on the latter and came to an agreement with Ford Performance Racing to operate a fully supported customer car as a satellite of the main FPR team in much the same manner as Rod Nash Racing. Alex Davison drove the Jeld-Wen supported car in 2013, taking one podium at the Phillip Island event and finishing the season in 13th. In 2014, Jack Perkins replaced Davison but could only manage 23rd in the championship. 

For 2015, Lee Holdsworth became the team's driver. The team had originally intended to remain in their existing relationship with Ford Performance Racing (now known as Tickford Racing), but they were replaced by Super Black Racing as the Ford team's second customer partnership. Instead, the team became a satellite team to the Holden Racing Team, and ran a Holden VF Commodore. Holdsworth finished 14th in the championship.

Independent team
In 2016, Team 18 began operating as an independent entity using a Triple Eight Race Engineering-built Commodore. Jeff Grech, the former Holden Racing Team team manager from 1993 to 2006, became team manager with backing from Preston Hire. It was a difficult season for the outfit, with Holdsworth suffering a major accident at the Darwin event, leaving him with a fractured pelvis and out of action for three rounds. He was replaced with Kurt Kostecki for Townsville and Ipswich (having borrowed the teenagers' Development Series chassis) and Karl Reindler for Sydney Motorsport Park. The team did not fare well in Holdsworth's return for the Enduro Cup either, retiring from the Bathurst 1000 after two laps with a broken rocker, as well as one of the Gold Coast 600 races after Reindler crashed exiting turn three. The team finished 15th in the teams' championship, beating only Britek Motorsport and the 'Supergirls' wildcard.

Holdsworth remained at the team for 2017, starting with two midfield finishes at the Adelaide 500 before being involved in a high-speed crash with Nick Percat at the non-championship round at the Australian Grand Prix, after Percat lost braking entering turn one. The team avoided the multi-car pile-up in Tasmania, however, were caught out in the changeable conditions on the Sunday, finishing 17th. The team continued to run midfield throughout the season, Holdsworth ending the season 16th in the standings with a best result of 4th on the Saturday at the Newcastle 500. Holdsworth did not finish in the top ten again until one year later in Newcastle, enduring a difficult 2018 campaign that was hampered by reliability issues, ending up in 21st in the championship. 

Ahead of the 2019 Supercars Championship, the team acquired the services of 2015 series champion Mark Winterbottom, in what became a switch of seats with Holdsworth going to Tickford Racing. As part of Winterbottom's arrival, the team also re-branded with backing from Stanley Black & Decker's Irwin Industrial Tools, hired new staff including team manager Steve Henderson and engineer Phil Keed and upgraded their customer relationship with Triple Eight Race Engineering. The changes brought an immediate upturn in results with two top-ten finishes at the Adelaide 500 before Winterbottom took the team's first pole position at the Tasmania SuperSprint. In 2020 the team will expand to two cars with a second REC purchased from Kelly Racing, again with backing from Stanley Black & Decker, this time from their DeWalt brand with Scott Pye recruited from Walkinshaw Andretti United.

Supercars Championship drivers
The following is a list of drivers who have driven for the team in the Supercars Championship, in order of their first appearance. Drivers who only drove for the team on a part-time basis are listed in italics.

 Alex Davison (2013)
 John McIntyre (2013)
 Jack Perkins (2014)
 Cameron Waters (2014)
 Lee Holdsworth (2015–18)
 Sébastien Bourdais (2015)
 Kurt Kostecki (2016)
 Karl Reindler (2016–17)
 Jason Bright (2018)
 Mark Winterbottom (2019–present)
 Steven Richards (2019)
 Scott Pye (2020–present)
 James Golding (2020–2021)
 Dean Fiore (2020)
 Michael Caruso (2021–present)
 Tyler Everingham (2022)

Complete Bathurst 1000 results

Car results

Car No. 18 results

Car No. 20 results

References

Australian auto racing teams
Sports teams in Victoria (Australia)
Supercars Championship teams
2013 establishments in Australia
Auto racing teams established in 2013